The National Vigilance Association was a British society established in August 1885 "for the enforcement and improvement of the laws for the repression of criminal vice and public immorality".

The Association was established in response to articles exposing child prostitution published by W. T. Stead in the Pall Mall Gazette. Stead became a member of its council.

Notes

Organizations established in 1885
1885 establishments in England
Censorship
Censorship in the United Kingdom